Cathedral High School may refer to:

Cathedral High School (Boston)
Cathedral High School (Texas)
Cathedral Carmel High School (Lafayette, Louisiana)
Cathedral High School (Springfield, Massachusetts)
Cathedral High School (Los Angeles)
Cathedral High School (Detroit, Michigan)
Cathedral High School (New Ulm, Minnesota)
Cathedral High School (St. Cloud, Minnesota)
Cathedral High School (Natchez, Mississippi)
Cathedral High School (New York City)
Cathedral High School (Indianapolis)
Cathedral Catholic High School (San Diego, California)
Cathedral City High School (Cathedral City, California)
Cathedral High School (Hamilton, Ontario)
 Cathedral High School (Omaha, Nebraska), defunct high school, which was affiliated with St. Cecilia Cathedral
Cathedral High School, Bangalore
St. John's Cathedral High School (Milwaukee, Wisconsin)